Calliotropis rudecta is a species of sea snail, a marine gastropod mollusk in the family Eucyclidae.

Description
The height of the shell attains 5 mm.

Distribution
This species occurs in the Atlantic Ocean off Morocco.

References

 Locard, A., 1898 Mollusques testacés. In: Expéditions scientifiques du Travailleur et du Talisman pendant les années 1880, 1881, 1882, 1883, vol. Tome 2, pp. 1–515 p, 18 pls

External links
 To World Register of Marine Species

rudecta
Gastropods described in 1898